The Federal Service for Supervision in Education and Science (Rosobrnadzor) is a Russian federal agency tasked with the supervision and control of national education and science. It was formed in 2004 and is an independent agency that functions as part of the government of Russia.

References

External links 
 Official website  

2004 establishments in Russia
Government agencies established in 2004
Government agencies of Russia